Altered Spaces is a live album by bassist/composer Reggie Workman. It was recorded in February 1992 at Swarthmore College in Swarthmore, Pennsylvania, and was released by Leo Records in 1993. On the album, Workman is joined by vocalist Jeanne Lee, clarinetist Don Byron, violinist Jason Hwang, pianist Marilyn Crispell, and drummer Gerry Hemingway.

Reception

The authors of the Penguin Guide to Jazz Recordings awarded the album 3½ stars, and commented: "Altered Spaces is the most ambitious work the Ensemble has tackled... Impressive... for its sheer cross-grainedness."

Writing for AllMusic, Don Snowden remarked: "this is very much in the chamber jazz zone, closer to the European avant-classical wing than any rhythm-driven freedom pulse variant... It's challenging stuff with lovely moments, for sure, and probably made for an absorbing ride in concert, but as a pure listening experience, the ebb and flow is a bit too dry and severe to fully make the transition to disc. Altered Spaces is fine for advanced Reggie Workman fans, but tough for beginners who can find more accessible discs for an introduction to his music as a leader."

Track listing
All compositions by Reggie Workman.

 "Apart (Revisited)" - 27:07
 "Ballad For The Silf" - 6:33
 "Altered Spaces" - 8:02
 "Ten" - 12:48
 "Suite Pour Le Courage" - 19:21
 "Wha's Nine" - 3:43

Personnel 
 Reggie Workman – bass
 Jeanne Lee – voice
 Don Byron – clarinet
 Jason Hwang – violin
 Marilyn Crispell – piano
 Gerry Hemingway – drums

Production
 Leo Feigin, Reggie Workman – producers
 John Rosenberg – recording engineer

References

1993 live albums
Reggie Workman live albums
Leo Records live albums